Al diablo con los guapos (English title: Down with the Beautiful) is a Mexican telenovela produced by Angelli Nesma Medina for Televisa. It aired on Canal de las Estrellas from October 8, 2007 to June 6, 2008. It is a remake of Argentinian telenovela Muñeca Brava. It stars Allisson Lozz, Eugenio Siller, Laura Flores, César Évora, and Andrés Zuno. In the United States, the telenovela aired on Univision from January 21, 2008 to September 19, 2008.

Plot
Al Diablo con los Guapos tells the story of a girl named Milagros, who, at the age 18, leaves the convent where she was raised and finds work at Regina Belmonte, the matriarch of a family company. Regina sympathizes with Milagros immediately but the remainder of the family does not bear her self-assured character and her bad manners.

The son of Constancio Belmonte, Alejandro, is interested in Milagros because of her captivating spirit. Little by little, between suits and discussions, the two begin to date, although Milagros refuses to accept him. She knows Alejandro's reputation of being a womanizer and believes she is going to be abandoned like her mother. Besides this, Alejandro is already engaged.

Constancio Belmonte, Regina's son, detests his family and does not even try hide it. Especially to his wife Luciana, since his father obliged him to marry her which in turn separated him from Rosario, the love of his life. At the time, she was expecting a baby of his, but she disappeared without leaving a trace. As soon as he learned this, Constancio did not try to locate his child who ended up to be Milagros.

Andrea, Alejandro's girlfriend, only wants him for his money, and at the same time is having an affair with Constancio whom she says she loves. Hugo, Alejandro's cousin, is in love with Mili and paints portraits of her that he admires, he also fakes broken leg injury to get closer to her but later confesses his love.

After confessing their love for one another, they are faced with much opposition. Andrea & Hugo make it their mission to separate them, making many plans to ensure that happens. However their plots failed and Alejandro and Milagros are together. But later Alejandro meets Florencia, the daughter of his father's business partner. They begin to take a liking to each other and eventually go out while Alejandro still harbors feeling for Mili. While this is happening Mili begins to get jealous and then tries to sabotage their relationship which causes all of them to have a fight. But in the end Alejandro is still deeply in love with Mili they try to get married until Alejandro's mother Luciana sabotages their plans. Luciana lies to Mili saying that they are related and reveals that her father is Constancio.

Eventually Mili marries Hugo. Alejandro marries Florencia and they have a little girl, Rosario. Many problems arise in their marriage eventually leaving both Alejandro and Florencia unhappy and miserable. Mili and Hugo are as well unhappy because Hugo wants Mili to love him but she is still in love with Alejandro. Hugo then starts cheating on her with the maid Karla. Mili finds out she is not related to Alejandro and they begin their romance again.

Hugo finally gives Mili a divorce. Florencia leaves Alejandro for her ex-husband while leaving Alejandro with their daughter, Rosario. In the end, Florencia is shot to death by her ex-husband.

Mili's mother Rosario returns to find everyone in shock because she was presumed dead.

Days pass by and Mili marries Alejandro, Karla marries Hugo and Valeria marries Rocky as a triple wedding. then many years later the novel shows how time passes by between the married couples and they start to have kids and grandkids.

At the end, it shows a beach scene with Mili and Alejandro walking together at a very old age while remembering that afternoon that they made love on the beach and suddenly they die together.

Cast

Main
Laura Flores as  Luciana Arango
César Évora as Constancio Belmonte
Allisson Lozz as Milagros "Mili" Lascurain/Milagros "Mili" Belmonte de Miranda
Eugenio Siller as Alejandro Belmonte/Alejandro Miranda Arango
Alicia Rodríguez as Regina Lascuraín viuda de Belmonte
Altair Jarabo as Valeria Belmonte Arango de Juárez  
Ricardo Margaleff as Ricardo "Rocky" Juárez "Morgan"
Margarita Magaña as Karla Luna de Arango
Andres Zuno as Hugo Arango Tamayo 
Michelle Ramaglia as Lina de Senderos 
Rafael León de los Cobos as Roberto "Bobby" Senderos
Georgina Salgado as Gloria 
Ramon Valdez as Chamuco
Marco Muñoz as Damián Arango
Tania Vazquez as Andrea Castillo Riquelme
Luz Maria Jerez as Milena de Senderos
Alfonso Iturralde as Eugenio Senderos
Dacia González as Madre 
Miguel Pizarro as Braulio Ramos
José Luis Cordero as Horacio
Carlos Cobos as Padre Manuel
Leticia Perdigón as Socorro Luna/Amparo Rodríguez
Mónika Sánchez as Young Rosario Ramos
Maribel Guardia as Rosella Dillano/Rosario Ramos
Rossana San Juan as Roxana
Andrea García as Zulema
Eduardo Liñán as Armando Calvillo
Arsenio Campos as Peralta
Fabián Lavalle as Instructor de Modelos
Sheyla as Sor "Cachete" Catalina and Macarena
Juan Peláez as Federico Belmonte
Fabian Robles as Rigoberto
Aitor Iturriz as Mateo Roblero
Eduardo Antonio as Silvestre
Nora Velázquez as Bloody Mary 
Gustavo Rojo as Lic. Ernesto 
Roberto Vander as Néstor Miranda
Ricardo Fastlicht as Paolo
Ariadne Díaz as Florencia Echevarria de Belmonte 
Manuela Ímaz as Marisela Echevarría
Gloria Sierra as Nefertiti
Daniel Ducoing as Ramses

References

External links

Site of Allisson Lozz and Al Diablo con los Guapos
Official Site

2007 telenovelas
2007 Mexican television series debuts
2008 Mexican television series endings
Mexican telenovelas
Televisa telenovelas
Mexican television series based on Argentine television series
Spanish-language telenovelas